Grace Walcott Hazard Conkling (February 7, 1878 – November 15, 1958) was an American author, a poet and an English professor.

Background

Grace Walcott Hazard was born in New York City on February 7, 1878.  She earned a bachelor of letters degree at Smith College and then taught at the Graham School in New York. Hazard moved to France to study music, but she became ill and returned to the United States.

In 1905, Hazard married Roscoe Platt Conkling, and they lived on a ranch in Mexico. Conkling had two daughters, Hilda and Elsa. She died at the age of 80 on November 15, 1958.

Career

In 1914, Hazard taught English at Smith College where she remained till she retired in 1947.

Conkling attracted wide attention as the teacher of her little daughter, Hilda Conkling, whose Poems by a Little Girl (1920) displayed great ability at an early age. Grace copied down her daughter's poems as they were spoken, which is the only record that exists of Hilda's work.

Writings

Her collected volumes of verse include:  
 Afternoons of April (1915)
 Wilderness Songs (1920)
 Flying Fish: A Book of Songs and Sonnets (1926)
 Witch and Other Poems (1929)

References

External links
Grace Hazard Conkling papers at the Smith College Archives, Smith College Special Collections
 
 
 
 

American women poets
Writers from New York City
Smith College alumni
1878 births
1958 deaths
MacDowell Colony fellows
20th-century American poets
20th-century American women writers